Hal on Earth is an album by American avant-garde jazz composer, bandleader, and multi-instrumentalist Hal Russell recorded in 1989 which was originally released on cassette and released on CD on the Abduction label in 1995.

Reception

The Allmusic review awarded the album 4 stars stating "the band was at a peak during this time, and this album showcases everything that made it such a singular group. From the inspired, one-upping interplay between Russell and fellow saxophonist Mars Williams to the manic pacing and daffy sense of humor (often evident in Russell's screwball theme melodies), this album makes it clear that the group was truly enjoying itself as it played".

Track listing
All compositions by Hal Russell except as indicated 
 "Raining Violets" (Brian Sandstrom) - 4:25  
 "Autumn Squeeze" (Kent Kessler) - 5:14  
 "Calling All Mothers" - 2:39  
 "Ode to Monica Chavez" - 2:56  
 "Monica's Having a Baby" - 4:43  
 "Stay Cinderella" - 3:40  
 "Dance of the Spider People" (Mars Williams) - 4:26  
 "Hal on Earth" (Steve Hunt) - 8:56  
 "Lunceford" - 4:12  
 "Hal the Weenie" - 7:29  
 "Temporarily" (Hunt) - 8:58

Personnel
Hal Russell - tenor saxophone, soprano saxophone, trumpet, marimba
Mars Williams - tenor saxophone, soprano saxophone, didgeridoo
Brian Sandstrom - bass, trumpet, guitar
Kent Kessler - bass, kalimba, didgeridoo
Steve Hunt -- drums, vibraphone, didgeridoo

References

Hal Russell albums
NRG Ensemble albums
1995 albums